Borovoy (masculine), Borovaya (feminine), or Borovoye (neuter) is the name of several inhabited localities in Russia.

Modern localities

Altai Krai
As of 2012, two rural localities in Altai Krai bear this name:
Borovoy, Altai Krai, a settlement in Malougrenevsky Selsoviet of Biysky District; 
Borovoye, Altai Krai (or Borovoy), a selo in Borovskoy Selsoviet of Krutikhinsky District;

Arkhangelsk Oblast
As of 2012, two rural localities in Arkhangelsk Oblast bear this name:
Borovoye, Konoshsky District, Arkhangelsk Oblast, a settlement in Yertsevsky Selsoviet of Konoshsky District
Borovoye, Velsky District, Arkhangelsk Oblast, a settlement in Blagoveshchensky Selsoviet of Velsky District

Belgorod Oblast
As of 2012, two rural localities in Belgorod Oblast bear this name:
Borovoye, Belgorod Oblast, a selo in Novooskolsky District
Borovaya, Belgorod Oblast, a selo in Starooskolsky District

Chelyabinsk Oblast
As of 2012, five rural localities in Chelyabinsk Oblast bear this name:
Borovoy, Chelyabinsk Oblast, a settlement under the administrative jurisdiction of the Town of Verkhny Ufaley
Borovoye, Bredinsky District, Chelyabinsk Oblast, a selo in Borovskoy Selsoviet of Bredinsky District
Borovoye, Chebarkulsky District, Chelyabinsk Oblast, a village in Sarafanovsky Selsoviet of Chebarkulsky District
Borovoye, Krasnoarmeysky District, Chelyabinsk Oblast, a village in Brodokalmaksky Selsoviet of Krasnoarmeysky District
Borovoye, Oktyabrsky District, Chelyabinsk Oblast, a selo in Borovoy Selsoviet of Oktyabrsky District

Irkutsk Oblast
As of 2012, one rural locality in Irkutsk Oblast bears this name:
Borovoye, Irkutsk Oblast, an area in Ziminsky District

Ivanovo Oblast
As of 2012, one rural locality in Ivanovo Oblast bears this name:
Borovoye, Ivanovo Oblast, a village in Yuryevetsky District

Kaliningrad Oblast
As of 2012, one rural locality in Kaliningrad Oblast bears this name:
Borovoye, Kaliningrad Oblast, a settlement in Gvardeysky Rural Okrug of Bagrationovsky District

Republic of Karelia
As of 2012, one rural locality in the Republic of Karelia bears this name:
Borovoy, Republic of Karelia, a settlement in Kalevalsky District

Kemerovo Oblast
As of 2012, one rural locality in Kemerovo Oblast bears this name:
Borovoy, Kemerovo Oblast (or Borovy), a settlement in Usmanskaya Rural Territory of Chebulinsky District;

Kirov Oblast
As of 2012, one rural locality in Kirov Oblast bears this name:
Borovoy, Kirov Oblast, a settlement under the administrative jurisdiction of Lesnoy Urban-Type Settlement in Verkhnekamsky District;

Komi Republic
As of 2012, one urban locality in the Komi Republic bears this name:
Borovoy, Komi Republic, an urban-type settlement under the administrative jurisdiction of the town of republic significance of Ukhta;

Leningrad Oblast
As of 2012, one rural locality in Leningrad Oblast bears this name:
Borovoye, Leningrad Oblast, a settlement under the administrative jurisdiction of Kuznechninskoye Settlement Municipal Formation in Priozersky District;

Lipetsk Oblast
As of 2012, one rural locality in Lipetsk Oblast bears this name:
Borovoye, Lipetsk Oblast, a selo in Borovskoy Selsoviet of Usmansky District;

Novgorod Oblast
As of 2012, one rural locality in Novgorod Oblast bears this name:
Borovaya, Novgorod Oblast, a village in Zhirkovskoye Settlement of Demyansky District

Novosibirsk Oblast
As of 2012, two rural localities in Novosibirsk Oblast bear this name:
Borovoye, Novosibirsk Oblast, a selo in Novosibirsky District
Borovaya, Novosibirsk Oblast, a village in Toguchinsky District

Omsk Oblast
As of 2012, one rural locality in Omsk Oblast bears this name:
Borovoye, Omsk Oblast, a settlement in Boyevoy Rural Okrug of Isilkulsky District

Oryol Oblast
As of 2012, one rural locality in Oryol Oblast bears this name:
Borovoye, Oryol Oblast, a selo in Borovskoy Selsoviet of Bolkhovsky District

Penza Oblast
As of 2012, one rural locality in Penza Oblast bears this name:
Borovaya, Penza Oblast, a village under the administrative jurisdiction of Verkhozim Work Settlement in Kuznetsky District

Perm Krai
As of 2012, one rural locality in Perm Krai bears this name:
Borovaya, Perm Krai, a village in Kungursky District

Ryazan Oblast
As of 2012, two rural localities in Ryazan Oblast bear this name:
Borovoye, Shilovsky District, Ryazan Oblast, a selo in Borovsky Rural Okrug of Shilovsky District
Borovoye, Skopinsky District, Ryazan Oblast, a selo in Shelemishevsky Rural Okrug of Skopinsky District

Smolensk Oblast
As of 2012, three rural localities in Smolensk Oblast bear this name:
Borovaya, Khislavichsky District, Smolensk Oblast, a village in Gorodishchenskoye Rural Settlement of Khislavichsky District
Borovaya, Safonovsky District, Smolensk Oblast, a village in Staroselskoye Rural Settlement of Safonovsky District
Borovaya, Smolensky District, Smolensk Oblast, a village in Mikhnovskoye Rural Settlement of Smolensky District

Sverdlovsk Oblast
As of 2012, seven rural localities in Sverdlovsk Oblast bear this name:
Borovoy, Sverdlovsk Oblast, a settlement in Pervomaysky Selsoviet of Serovsky District
Borovaya, Kushva, Sverdlovsk Oblast, a village in Borovskoy Selsoviet under the administrative jurisdiction of the Town of Kushva
Borovaya, Alapayevsky District, Sverdlovsk Oblast, a village in Koksharovsky Selsoviet of Alapayevsky District
Borovaya, Irbitsky District, Sverdlovsk Oblast, a village in Rudnovsky Selsoviet of Irbitsky District
Borovaya, Talitsky District, Sverdlovsk Oblast, a village in Vnov-Yurmytsky Selsoviet of Talitsky District
Borovaya, Turinsky District, Sverdlovsk Oblast, a village in Korkinsky Selsoviet of Turinsky District
Borovaya, Verkhotursky District, Sverdlovsk Oblast, a village in Prokopyevsky Selsoviet of Verkhotursky District

Tula Oblast
As of 2012, one rural locality in Tula Oblast bears this name:
Borovoye, Tula Oblast, a village in Novodoletsky Rural Okrug of Belyovsky District

Tver Oblast
As of 2012, four rural localities in Tver Oblast bear this name:
Borovoye, Penovsky District, Tver Oblast, a village in Chaykinskoye Rural Settlement of Penovsky District
Borovoye, Torzhoksky District, Tver Oblast, a village in Budovskoye Rural Settlement of Torzhoksky District
Borovaya, Maksatikhinsky District, Tver Oblast, a village in Kostretskoye Rural Settlement of Maksatikhinsky District
Borovaya, Staritsky District, Tver Oblast, a village in Staritsa Rural Settlement of Staritsky District

Tyumen Oblast
As of 2012, one rural locality in Tyumen Oblast bears this name:
Borovoye, Tyumen Oblast, a selo in Borovsky Rural Okrug of Ishimsky District

Yaroslavl Oblast
As of 2012, one rural locality in Yaroslavl Oblast bears this name:
Borovaya, Yaroslavl Oblast, a village in Karabikhsky Rural Okrug of Yaroslavsky District

Alternative names
Borovaya, alternative name of Bor, a village in Ust-Tsilma Selo Administrative Territory of Ust-Tsilemsky District in the Komi Republic; 
Borovaya, alternative name of Borovskaya, a village in Zamezhnaya Selo Administrative Territory of Ust-Tsilemsky District in the Komi Republic; 
Borovaya, alternative name of Chistopolye, a village in Baturinsky Selsoviet of Shadrinsky District in Kurgan Oblast; 
Borovaya, alternative name of Borovskoye, a selo in Borovskoy Selsoviet of Kataysky District in Kurgan Oblast; 
Borovoye, alternative name of Dom otdykha "Borovoye", a settlement in Dzerzhinskoye Settlement Municipal Formation of Luzhsky District in Leningrad Oblast; 
Borovoye, alternative name of Borovskoye, a selo in Borovskoy Selsoviet of Aleysky District in Altai Krai; 
Borovoye, alternative name of Borovskoye, a selo in Borovskoy Selsoviet of Belozersky District in Kurgan Oblast; 
Borovoye, alternative name of Borovichi, a selo in Bakharevsky Selsoviet of Safakulevsky District in Kurgan Oblast; 
Borovoye, alternative name of Burabay, Kazakhstan
Lake Borovoye, alternative name of Lake Burabay, Kazakhstan